The Messerschmitt P.1112 was a proposed German jet fighter, developed by Messerschmitt AG during the closing stages of World War II, and intended for use by the Luftwaffe. The progress of the war prevented the completion of a prototype before the fall of Nazi Germany. Its design, however, had a direct influence on postwar US Navy carrier fighters.

Design and development
The work on the Me P.1112 started on 25 February 1945 after Willy Messerschmitt decided to halt the development of the Messerschmitt P.1111, which would have required, as standard equipment, a pressurized cockpit and ejection seat. Designed by the head of the Messerschmitt Project Office Woldemar Voigt (1907–1980), between 3 and 30 March 1945 as an alternative to the Me P.1111, the Me P.1112 design was less radical than the P.1111 and incorporated the lessons learned from the development of the Messerschmitt P.1110 design. Voigt estimated that the Me P.1112 would commence flight testing by mid-1946.

Intended to be powered by a single Heinkel HeS 011 turbojet, three design concepts of the Me P.1112 were developed. The last proposed design was the Me P.1112/V1 using a V-tail design and fuselage lateral intakes; the two first were the Me P.1112 S/1, with wing root air intakes, and the Me P.1112 S/2, with fuselage lateral intakes, both with a larger, single fin; both designs lacked conventional horizontal stabilizers. The aircraft's wing design was similar in appearance to that of Messerschmitt's Me 163 Komet rocket fighter. The pilot was seated in a semi-reclined position, and was equipped with an ejection seat.

A partial mockup of the Me P.1112 V/1, consisting of the aircraft's forward fuselage section, was constructed in the "Conrad von Hötzendorf" Kaserne at Oberammergau, but the Messerschmitt facilities there were occupied by American troops in April 1945, before construction of the prototype could begin.

Although the Me P.1112 was never completed, follow-on designs were already proposed, even as design work on the type itself was done. These included a proposed night fighter version, which was intended to be fitted with twin engines mounted in the wing roots of the aircraft.

Following the war, Voigt's experience in tailless aircraft design was put to use by the Chance Vought company  in the United States, where he was involved in the design of the F7U Cutlass fighter.

Specifications

See also

Notes

References
Citations

Bibliography

External links

 . Source Air Force Museum Collection

P.1112
Abandoned military aircraft projects of Germany
V-tail aircraft
Tailless aircraft
Single-engined jet aircraft
World War II jet aircraft of Germany